Harry Kambolis (born June 30, 1968) is a restaurateur who owned and operated Raincity Grill (1992-2014), C Restaurant (1997-2014) and Nu (2005-2011).

In the early 1990s, Kambolis built relationships with local farmers and producers of quality ingredients and served and promoted what later became known as Pacific Northwest cuisine. He also supported British Columbian wines, a burgeoning industry at the time, long before it was in vogue. By offering wines only from B.C. and the American Northwest, and by having a formidable "wines by the glass" program, Kambolis developed a successful business model that later was emulated.

The opening of C Restaurant, in 1997, created another opportunity for Kambolis to demonstrate his commitment to regional bounty. The restaurant's mandate was to look beyond the typically homogenized selection of seafood available on menus around the world. Kambolis, in tandem with his chefs Soren Fakstorp and Robert Clark, sourced and introduced about 60 local varieties of the highest quality seafoods, all of which were locally harvested. C Restaurant was credited with introducing and popularizing several B.C. seafoods (some back from extinction, some unfamiliar to the market), including geoduck, sablefish, pink salmon, and B.C. abalone.

Kambolis is the co-author, with Chef Robert Clark, of the cookbook "C Food".

References

 A Restaurant Empire's Last Service Alexandra Gill, Vancouver Magazine, Mar. 2015
 Renowned Vancouver Restaurants Raincity Grill, C Restaurant close Alexandra Gill, The Globe and Mail, Nov. 2014
 Need a caterer in a hurry? Harry Kambolis is your man Malcolm Parry, Vancouver Sun, March 2010
 Interview with Harry Kambolis, Paul Kamon, Urban Diner blog
 Vancouver restaurateur greens up his business, Vancouver Sun, December 6, 2007
 At Home with Restaurateur Harry Kambolis Mia Stainsby, August 13, 2009
 Edible Heroes
 Nu Opens West Broadway
 Nu to Open on Robson

1968 births
Living people
Businesspeople from Vancouver
Canadian restaurateurs
Writers from Vancouver